The 1945 SFR Yugoslavia Chess Championship was the 1st edition of SFR Yugoslav Chess Championship. Held between 15 September and 11 October  1945 in Novi Sad, SFR Yugoslavia, SAP Vojvodina. The tournament was won by Petar Trifunović.

Table and results

References 

Yugoslav Chess Championships
1945 in chess
Chess